The Polish Super Cup is an annually held match between the champions of the Ekstraklasa and the Polish Cup winners or, if the Ekstraklasa champions also win the Polish Cup, the Cup's runners-up. As of 2021, the Polish Super Cup has been played 31 times. The most successful club is Lech Poznań, who won 6 times. The most common participant are Legia Warsaw, as they played fourteen final games and have lost their eight following finals since 2012. Unlike in Polish Cup, there is no extra time played in the competition, therefore in case of a draw after regular time match goes straight into a penalty shoot-out.

Raków Częstochowa are the current holders of the trophy.

Results

Performances

Performance by club

Performance by qualification

See also
 Football in Poland
 Poland national football team
 List of Polish football champions
 Polish Cup

References

External links
Poland – List of Super Cup Finals, RSSSF.com

 
National association football supercups
Football cup competitions in Poland